The United States of America vs. Carl Krauch, et al., also known as the IG Farben Trial, was the sixth of the twelve trials for war crimes the U.S. authorities held in their occupation zone in Germany (Nuremberg) after the end of World War II. IG Farben was the private German chemicals company allied with the Nazis that manufactured the Zyklon B gas used to commit genocide against millions of European Jews in the Holocaust.

The twelve trials were all held before U.S. military courts, not before the International Military Tribunal, but took place in the same rooms at the Palace of Justice. The twelve U.S. trials are collectively known as the "Subsequent Nuremberg Trials" or, more formally, as the "Trials of War Criminals before the Nuremberg Military Tribunals" (NMT). The IG Farben Trial was the second of three trials of leading industrialists of Nazi Germany for their conduct during the Nazi regime. (The two other industrialist trials were the Flick Trial and the Krupp Trial.)

The defendants in this case had all been directors of IG Farben, a large German conglomerate of chemical firms. The company had been a major factor already in World War I, when their development of the Haber–Bosch process for nitrogen fixation compensated for Germany's being cut off from the Chilean nitrate trade and allowed IG Farben to produce synthetic nitrate and extract and process nitrogen for use in agricultural fertilizer. (Nitrate is an important component for the fabrication of explosives such as gunpowder, dynamite or TNT.) In World War II, Degesch (42.5 per cent owned by IG Farben) was the trademark holder of Zyklon B, the poison gas used at some Nazi extermination camps. IG Farben also developed processes for synthesizing gasoline and rubber from coal, and thereby contributed much to Germany's ability to wage a war despite having been cut off from all major oil fields. The charges consequently centered on preparing to wage an aggressive war, but also on slave labor and plundering.

The judges in this case, heard before Military Tribunal VI, were Curtis Grover Shake (presiding judge), former Chief Judge of the Indiana Supreme Court; James Morris from North Dakota; Paul M. Hebert, dean of the Law School of Louisiana State University; and Clarence F. Merrell, a lawyer from Indiana, and friend of Judge Shake, as an alternate judge. The Chief of Counsel for the Prosecution was Telford Taylor. The indictment was filed on May 3, 1947; the trial lasted from August 27, 1947, until July 30, 1948. Of the 24 defendants arraigned, 13 were found guilty on one or the other counts of the indictment and sentenced to prison terms ranging from one and one half to eight years, including time already served; 10 defendants were acquitted of all charges. Max Brüggemann (Farben's chief legal advisor) was removed from the trial and his case discontinued on September 9, 1947, due to medical reasons.

Indictment

 Planning, preparation, initiation, and waging of wars of aggression and invasions of other countries.
 War crimes and crimes against humanity through the plundering and spoliation of occupied territories, and the seizure of plants in Austria, Czechoslovakia, Poland, Norway, France, and Russia.
 War crimes and crimes against humanity through participation in the enslavement and deportation to slave labor on a gigantic scale of concentration camp inmates and civilians in occupied countries, and of prisoners of war, and the mistreatment, terrorization, torture, and murder of enslaved persons.
 Membership in a criminal organization, the SS.
 Acting as leaders in a conspiracy to commit the crimes mentioned under counts 1, 2, and 3.

All defendants were indicted on counts 1, 2, 3, and 5. Only Schneider, Bütefisch, and von der Heyde were charged on count 4, "Membership in the SS". The SS had been declared a criminal organization previously by the IMT.

Despite the extensive evidence presented by the prosecution that showed that the company had been deeply involved in Germany's rearmament after World War I from the onset, the tribunal rejected the charges for preparing an aggressive war and for conspiracy to that end. On count three ("slave labor"), the judgement "allowed the defendants the benefit of the defense of 'necessity (Telford Taylor, "The Nuremberg War Crimes Trials"; International Conciliation, No. 450, April 1949). Only in the case of Auschwitz, where IG Farben had constructed a plant next to the concentration camp with the clear intent to use inmates as slave workers, did the tribunal consider the evidence sufficient to prove that IG Farben acted on its own initiative. The tribunal concluded that the defendants could be held responsible only for this one case.

Judge Hebert filed a dissenting opinion, in which he argued that the defense of "necessity" did not apply and that all defendants should have been found guilty on count 3 of the indictment. He stated that:

... the record shows that Farben willingly cooperated and gladly utilized each new source of manpower as it developed. Disregard of basic human rights did not deter these defendants.

Willing cooperation with the slave labor utilization of the Third Reich was a matter of corporate policy that permeated the whole Farben organization ... For this reason, criminal responsibility goes beyond the actual immediate participants at Auschwitz. It includes other Farben Vorstand plant-managers and embraces all who knowingly participated in the shaping of the corporate policy.

Judge Hebert filed his statement on December 28, 1948, nearly 5 months after the judgment.

Defendants

I — Indicted   G — Indicted and found guilty

The defendants Ilgner and Kugler were released immediately after the judgement since they had already been in custody longer than their sentence.

Bibliography
 Grietje Baars: Capitalism´s Victor´s Justice? The Hidden Stories Behind the Prosecution of Industrialists Post-WWII. In: The Hidden Histories of War Crime Trials. Heller and Simpson, Oxford University Press 2013, .
 Kevin Jon Heller: The Nuremberg Military Tribunals and the Origins of International Criminal Law. Oxford University Press, 2011, .
 Florian Jeßberger: Von den Ursprüngen eines „Wirtschaftsvölkerstrafrechts“: Die I.G. Farben vor Gericht. In: Juristenzeitung. 2009.
 Stefan H. Lindner: Das Urteil im I.G.-Farben-Prozess. In: NMT – Die Nürnberger Militärtribunale zwischen  Geschichte, Gerechtigkeit und Rechtschöpfung. Priemel und Stiller, Hamburger Edition 2013,

References

External links
Trial proceedings from the Mazal Library.
 
Another description
The Authentic Records from the Nuremberg Tribunal Against the Oil and Drug Cartel
The “relay of life” to the next generation - IG Farben connection

Trial
United States Nuremberg Military Tribunals
1947 in Germany
1948 in Germany
1947 in case law
1948 in case law
Holocaust trials